Hataman is a surname. Notable people with the surname include:

Benjamin Hataman, Filipino staff member charged with murder in the 2007 assassination of Wahab Akbar in Basilan
Gulam S. Salliman-Hataman, Filipino politician
Hadjiman S. Hataman-Salliman (Jim Saliman) (Lakas-Kampi CMD), a Filipino politician, representative from the lone district of Basilan
Mujiv Sabbihi Hataman, Filipino politician, party-list representative of Anak Mindanao (AMIN) in the House of Representatives

See also

Ataman
Atamania
Athamania
Hat man
Hatamen
Hateman
Hatman
Hetman
Hitman
Hotman
Otaman
Whatman (disambiguation)
Whatta Man
Yattaman